Petrakovo is a rural locality (a village) in Mayskoye Rural Settlement, Vologodsky District, Vologda Oblast, Russia. The population was 11 as of 2002.

Geography 
The distance to Vologda is 18 km, to Kubenskoye is 7 km.

References 

Rural localities in Vologodsky District